Cola Petruccioli (1360–1401) was an Italian painter from Orvieto in Umbria,
known as an apprentice to Ugolino di Prete Ilaro, active in the period around 1400 and contemporary of the Sienese School.

His works are seen in the Cathedral of Assisi, as well as in the
Capella de Corporale in Orvieto.  In Cetona he painted frescoes of Virgin Mary in the Franciscan Hermitage, Convento di Santa Maria a Belverde.  These are shown in Enzo Carli's Gli Affreschi di Belverde. (Edam, Florence, 1977).  He painted a diptych the contains an Annuciation and a Crucifixion (1395), displayed in the Pinacoteca Civica of the town of Spello.  He died in Perugia.

References

External links

Altar piece by Petruccioli, on display in Pisa.
Fresco of St. Claudius from Spello, 1393. The figure in the fresco has a set square as emblem; this is presumably Saint Claudius of the Four Crowned Martyrs, who is associated with stonemasonry.

1360 births
1401 deaths
People from Orvieto
14th-century Italian painters
Italian male painters
15th-century Italian painters
Umbrian painters
Fresco painters